
Gmina Baćkowice is a rural gmina (administrative district) in Opatów County, Świętokrzyskie Voivodeship, in south-central Poland.

The gmina contains part of the protected area called Jeleniowska Landscape Park.

Villages
Gmina Baćkowice contains the villages and settlements of Baćkowice, Baranówek, Gołoszyce, Janczyce, Modliborzyce, Nowy Nieskurzów, Olszownica, Oziębłów, Piórków, Piórków-Kolonia, Piskrzyn, Rudniki, Stary Nieskurzów, Wszachów and Żerniki.

Neighbouring gminas
Gmina Baćkowice is bordered by the gminas of Iwaniska, Łagów, Opatów, Sadowie and Waśniów.

References

Polish official population figures 2006

Backowice
Opatów County